The Chatham Maroons are a junior ice hockey team based in Chatham, Ontario, Canada.  They play in the Western division of the Greater Ontario Junior Hockey League (GOJHL).  The Maroons were the 1970 Western Ontario Junior A Champions and 1973 Southern Ontario Junior A Champions.  The Maroons have won multiple Junior B league titles and the 1999 Sutherland Cup as Ontario Hockey Association Junior B Champions. In the 2021-2022 season, the Maroons won the GOJHL Western Conference Championship 4-2 over the Leamington Flyers. The Maroons dedicated their Championship in honour of  their longtime equipment manager and team volunteer, Randy DeWael, who died suddenly during the playoffs.

History

The Maroons originated in the Border Cities Junior B Hockey League in 1959.  The team later moved to the stronger Western Junior "B" league in 1964 and continued with the league, even when it became the renegade Southern Ontario Junior A Hockey League in 1970.  The Maroons left the league in 1976, became the Maple City Fords and rejoined the current Western Junior "B" league.  The Maroons became the MicMacs in 1988, but switched back to their traditional "Maroons" moniker in 1995.

At the 2004 NHL Entry Draft, Ryan Jones was drafted as a Maroon in the fourth round by the Minnesota Wild, 111th overall.  He attended and played for Miami University. After his collegiate career, Minnesota traded Jones to the Nashville Predators.

The Maroons participated in the 2006 Sutherland Cup round robin, but lost out to the Niagara Falls Canucks and the Cambridge Winterhawks with a 1-3 record.

The Maroons began the 2013-14 season slowly and resorted to trading for four of their territorial rival's, the Lambton Shores Predators, top players (Kyle Brothers, Adam Arsenault, Tanner Ferguson, and Connor Annett) in a series of high-profile trades for players and cash.  The Maroons also released 2012-13 starting all-star goaltender Darien Ekblad and replaced him with the Cambridge Winter Hawks' goaltender Jacob Keogh while picking up NOJHL Jr. A forward Kyle Rowe.  Ekblad would get picked up by the Junior C Essex 73's and tend them to a Great Lakes League championship.  Right before the trade deadline, the Maroons picked up forward Charlie Izaguirre from the fizzling Port Colborne Pirates for cash and prospects.  On January 28, 2014, the Ontario Hockey Association ruled against the Maroons for exceeding their limit on import players.  General Manager Bill Szekesy was suspended for an entire season and the franchise fined $4500.  In addition, during the 2014-15 season, the Maroons will be limited to 30 cards instead of the usual 35.  On February 19, 2014, the OHA announced that despite a Maroons' appeal, the punishment will stand.  In addition, two wins were stripped from their record (versus Leamington Flyers and St. Marys Lincolns).  Despite the trades and controversies, the Maroons would sweep the Western Conference quarter-final against the Strathroy Rockets and semi-final against the LaSalle Vipers, before being quashed 4-games-to-1 in the conference final by the Leamington Flyers. 

The Maroons have since remained a strong presence in the ultra competitive Western Conference of the GOJHL. In 2017-18 the Maroons were only able to secure the 6th seed in the playoffs but upset a major rival the Lasalle Vipers in a highly competitive 7 game series in which the Maroons trailed the series 2-0 and 3-2 before prevailing. The Maroons would then battle the 1 seed London Nationals in another highly competitive series. The Maroons took game one in a classic game on a Bryce Yetman double overtime goal the Maroons however would not be able to overcome the Nationals high powered offense and suffering defense and fell in 6 games. 

In the offseason the Maroons made many moves to attempt to once again rain supreme over the West acquiring many veterans of various junior leagues highlighted by the acquisition of Nolan Gardiner a former Ottawa 67 from the Caledonia Corvairs. 

In the 2018 - 2019 season, the Maroons placed a competitive 3rd out of the 9 teams in the Western Conference. However, they would fall to the 6th seed Komoka Kings in 5 Games in the first round of the playoffs. The 2019 - 2020 season was cut short due to the onset of the COVID-19 pandemic in March 2020. There was no playoff games played in the 2020 Sutherland Cup, and the entire 2020-2021 season was cancelled.  

In the 2021 - 2022 season,  the Western Conference remained very competitive with there being only a 7 point difference between the first place Leamington Flyers and the third place Maroons. The Maroons began the Western Conference playoffs on a strong note beating 6th seed Komoka Kings in 5 games. In the second round, they faced frequent rivals, London Nationals without home ice advantage in the series. The Nationals had knocked the Maroons out of the playoffs in 4 of the last eight seasons. After losing a whopping 8-2 in Game 1, the Maroons came back to win 4 in a row and win the series 4-1 in 5 Games. For the first time since 2014, the Maroons appeared in the Western Conference Championship Final against first seed rival Leamington Flyers. After losing Game 1 in Leamington 3-1, the Maroons came back to win 6-1 on home ice in Game 2.  Leamington would take Game 3 in overtime, but the Chatham Maroons would come back to win Games 4,5 and 6 to win their first Western Conference Championship in 16 years. The Maroons dedicated their championship to their equipment manager and longtime Maroons staff and volunteer, Randy DeWael who died suddenly following their first round win over Komoka. Chatham faced the Cambridge Redhawks, Champions of  the Midwestern Conference and the Golden Horseshoe Conference Champion St Catharines Falcons.   

The Maroons are always a competitive team within the GOJHL and teams never take the trip down to the Chatham Memorial Arena for a weekly Sunday night battle lightly knowing that they will have played a strong team within the Conference in the Maroons. The Chatham Memorial Arena is one of the most electric and exciting environments in the entire league for hockey. The Maroons have a loyal and passionate fan base.

Season-by-season results

2021 - 2022 Executives, Coaching and Support Staff

President - Bill Szekesy
Vice President - Karen Szekesy
Director of Business Development - Andrew Doran
Assistant General Manager & Director of Player Development - Kevin Fisher
Head coach & General Manager -  Tyler Roeszler
Assistant coach - Levi Tetrault
Assistant coach - Ryan Hope 
Assistant coach - Kent Hamilton 
Goaltending Coach - Bino Pereira
Equipment Manager - Randy DeWael
Equipment Manager - Brayden Jee

Team Physician - Dr. Anthony Dixon
Team Chiropractor - Dr. Frank Little
Team Chiropractor - Dr. Jeff Wieringa

Playoffs
1969 Lost Semi-final
St. Thomas Barons defeated Chatham Maroons 4-games-to-2
1970 Won League
Chatham Maroons defeated St. Thomas Barons 4-games-to-none
Chatham Maroons defeated Brantford Foresters 5-games-to-2 WOJAHL CHAMPIONS
1971 Lost Semi-final
Guelph CMC's defeated Chatham Maroons 4-games-to-1 with 1 tie
1972 Lost Semi-final
Chatham Maroons defeated Windsor Spitfires 4-games-to-1
Detroit Jr. Red Wings defeated Chatham Maroons 4-games-to-3
1973 Won League, Won OHA Buckland Cup, Lost Dudley Hewitt Cup semi-final
Chatham Maroons defeated Welland Sabres 4-games-to-2 with 1 tie
Chatham Maroons defeated Guelph CMC's 4-games-to-3 with 1 tie SOJHL CHAMPIONS
Chatham Maroons defeated Wexford Raiders (OPJHL) 4-games-to-3 BUCKLAND CUP CHAMPIONS
Pembroke Lumber Kings (CJHL) defeated Chatham Maroons 4-games-to-3
1974 Lost Final
Chatham Maroons defeated Guelph CMC's 4-games-to-none with 1 tie
Chatham Maroons defeated Welland Sabres 4-games-to-2
Windsor Spitfires defeated Chatham Maroons 4-games-to-1
1975 Lost Semi-final
Chatham Maroons defeated Niagara Falls Flyers 4-games-to-1 with 1 tie
Guelph CMC's defeated Chatham Maroons 3-games-to-2 with 2 ties
1976 Lost Final
Chatham Maroons defeated Hamilton Mountain A's 4-games-to-3
Guelph Platers defeated Chatham Maroons 4-games-to-none

Sutherland Cup Appearances
1999: Chatham Maroons defeated Stratford Cullitons 4-games-to-3
2005: Thorold Blackhawks defeated Chatham Maroons 4-games-to-1
2022: St Catharines Falcons  defeated Chatham Maroons 2-games-to-0

Notable alumni
Andy Delmore
Colton Fretter
Rick Heinz
Ken Houston
Ryan Jones
Randy MacGregor
Dennis McCord
Vern Stenlund
Peter Sturgeon
Derek Wilkinson
Brian Wiseman
Kevin Westgarth

References

External links
Maroons Webpage
GOJHL Webpage

Western Junior B Hockey League teams
Chatham-Kent
1959 establishments in Ontario
Ice hockey clubs established in 1959